Vine and Bell Cottage, also known as Vine Cottages, is a Grade II listed building at 622 Fulham Road, Fulham, London, built in the early 18th century.

References

External links
 

Grade II listed buildings in the London Borough of Hammersmith and Fulham
Houses in the London Borough of Hammersmith and Fulham
Fulham
Grade II listed houses in London
Houses completed in the 18th century